The Empire Professional Baseball League (EPBL) is an independent baseball league that began play in 2016. The Empire League plays a 40-game regular season followed by a five-game post season. The four-team league consists of four teams from Upstate New York. League offices are in Tampa, Florida.

History 
The Empire League is a replacement of the North Country Baseball League, which folded after one season (and was itself a last-minute replacement for the East Coast Baseball League, which disbanded before the start of the 2015 season). The league fielded four teams based in the states of New York, New Hampshire and Maine for its inaugural season.

It is a low-budget league meant to give players recently graduated from college or with little professional experience an opportunity at staying in shape and providing them the chance at being signed to higher level league contracts with affiliated or independent teams. All league funding comes from advertisement sales, ticket sales and tryout revenue.

The league is operated by Eddie Gonzalez, former professional baseball player and NAIA All-American at Webber International University. Gonzalez is also a former NCBL executive.

The Sullivan Explorers, despite finishing the regular season with a losing record, won the 2016 league championship over the regular season winner Watertown Bucks.

Prior to the league's second season, the Watertown Bucks lost the lease to their stadium and were replaced by the Plattsburgh Redbirds. The New Hampshire Wild ceased operations and were replaced by a team from Puerto Rico; however, since a stadium deal in Puerto Rico had not yet been finalized, the team played the 2017 season as a travel team.

The league expanded to six teams for the 2018 season with two new franchises selected from four of the nine interested parties visited in 2017. On February 23, 2018, the league announced that one team will be a revival of the New Hampshire Wild, and the sixth team would be the return of the New York Bucks, formerly known as the Watertown Bucks.

On May 31, 2018, the league announced the Puerto Rico Islanders will play in Rincon, Puerto Rico, and the Sullivan Explorers would be known as the Aguada Explorers. For 2019, the Explorers would become a traveling team, and the Surge would move to Saranac Lake, New York.

Due to Covid-19, the 2020 Empire Professional Baseball League was held at Consol Energy Park in Washington, Pennsylvania.

Teams

Champions

See also
 Empire State Greys, a traveling team of EPBL players formed in 2022 to compete in the Frontier League

References

External links 
 

Independent baseball leagues in the United States
Sports leagues established in 2016
2016 establishments in the United States
Professional sports leagues in the United States